The Women's 10K Marathon swim at the 2007 Pan American Games took place in the waters of Copacabana Beach in Rio de Janeiro, Brazil on 14 July 2007.

Medalists

Results

References
 Official Site

Open Water, Women's
Pan American Games
2007 in women's swimming